Royal Botanic Gardens, Peradeniya are about 5.5 km to the west of the city of Kandy in the Central Province of Sri Lanka. In 2016, the garden was visited by 1.2 million locals and 400,000 foreign visitors. It is near the Mahaweli River (The longest river
in Sri Lanka). It is renowned for its collection of orchids. The garden includes more than 4000 species of plants, including orchids, spices, medicinal plants and palm trees. Attached to it is the "National Herbarium of Sri Lanka". It is managed by the Division of National Botanic Gardens of the Department of national botanic gardens.

History 

The origins of the Botanic Gardens date as far back as 1371 when King Wickramabahu III ascended the throne and kept court at Peradeniya near the Mahaweli river. This was followed by King Kirti Sri and King Rajadhi Rajasinghe. A temple was built on this location by King Wimala Dharma, but it was destroyed by the British when they were given control over the Kingdom of Kandy.

Thereafter, the groundwork for a botanical garden was formed by Alexandar Moon in 1821. He used the garden for coffee and cinnamon plants. The Botanical Garden at Peradeniya was formally established in 1843 with plants brought from Kew Garden, Slave Island, Colombo, and the Kalutara Garden in Kalutara. The Royal Botanic Garden, Peradeniya was made more independent and expanded under George Gardner as superintendent in 1844. On Gardner's death in 1849 George Henry Kendrick Thwaites became superintendent. He served until he resigned in 1879, when he was succeeded by Henry Trimen, who served until 1895.

The garden came under the administration of the Department of Agriculture when it was established in 1912.

There are avenues in the River Drive such as Cook's Pine Avenue, Palmyra Palm Avenue, Double Coconut Avenue, Cabbage Palm Avenue, and Royal Palm Avenue.
The classical Avenue of Palms is in this Garden. One item with a significant history is the Cannonball Tree planted by King George V of the United Kingdom and Queen Mary in 1901. It is often laden with fruit, which are thought to resemble cannonballs.

During World War II, the Botanic Garden was used by Lord Louis Mountbatten, the supreme commander of the allied forces in the South Asia, as the headquarters of the South East Asia Command.

The gardens were used as a location in the 1957 film The Bridge on the River Kwai.

Flora
Here is the list of some plants growing in Royal Botanical Gardens:

Gallery

Other botanic gardens in Sri Lanka 
 Hakgala Botanical Garden
 Henarathgoda Botanical Garden
 Mirijjawila Botanical Garden
 Seetawaka Botanical Garden, Avissawella 
 Medicinal Plant Gardens, Ganewatta near

References

External links 

 Department of National Botanic Gardens

1371 establishments in Asia
Botanical gardens in Sri Lanka
Parks in Kandy
Buildings and structures in Peradeniya